The Mauricio Báez Bridge is a Cable-stayed bridge near San Pedro de Macorís, located in the east of the Dominican Republic, around 40 km east of the capital city of Santo Domingo. It is one of the most modern bridges in the Dominican Republic and the Caribbean. It replaces an old suspension bridge, which was called Puente Ramfis (Ramfis Bridge).

The cost of the bridge was around RD$1 billion, and paid for by the SEOPC (Secretary of State for Public Works and Communications) after the approval of President Leonel Fernández.  It was opened on January 19, 2007. It is cable-stayed bridge with the longest span in the Caribbean.

External links 
 

Cable-stayed bridges
Bridges in the Dominican Republic
Bridges completed in 2007
Buildings and structures in San Pedro de Macorís Province